John Donaghy may refer to:

 John Donaghy (football manager), English football manager
 John Lyle Donaghy, Irish poet
 John Patrick Donaghy, Irish politician and physician
 Jack Donaghy (John Francis Donaghy), a fictional character on the TV series 30 Rock